Antonio Ante Canton is a canton of Ecuador, located in Imbabura Province. Its population at the 2001 census was 36,053. and increased to 43,518 in the 2010 census.

Antonio Ante is divided into five parishes: Atuntaqui (Hauntaki), Imbaya (San Luis de Cobuendo), San Francisco de Natabuela (Natawila), San José de Chaltura, and San Roque.

Demographics
Ethnic groups as of the Ecuadorian census of 2010:
Mestizo  77.6%
Indigenous  17.8%
White  2.5%
Afro-Ecuadorian  1.8%
Montubio  0.2%
Other  0.1%

References

Cantons of Imbabura Province